Edward Chaplin may refer to:

Edward Chaplin (politician) (1842–1883), MP for Lincoln
Edward Chaplin (diplomat) (born 1951), British diplomat, Ambassador to Italy